The 1962 Pontefract by-election was held on 22 March 1962 after the death of the incumbent Labour MP George Sylvester.  It was retained by the Labour candidate Joseph Harper.

Results

Pontefract
Elections in Wakefield
By-elections to the Parliament of the United Kingdom in West Yorkshire constituencies
1962 in England
1962 elections in the United Kingdom
1960s in Yorkshire